The San Mateo Union High School District is a high school district headquartered in San Mateo, California. In addition to San Mateo, the district serves the cities of San Bruno, Millbrae, Burlingame, Hillsborough, and Foster City.

Schools
The district consists of seven public high schools, one alternative high school (a "college high school"), one adult school, and one charter school in San Bruno, Millbrae, Burlingame, and San Mateo. The district serves a total population of 8,400 students with a staff of more than 900 employees;  the District Adult School has an additional 10,000 part-time students. The seven public schools participate in the Peninsula Athletic League.

The oldest high school in San Mateo County is Sequoia High School in Redwood City. It was founded in 1895. The next oldest school in the county is San Mateo High School, which opened in 1902. Within the district, SMHS was followed by Burlingame High School, which opened in the early 1920s, and then Capuchino High School in San Bruno in 1950. The district added more public high schools in the mid-50s and early 1960s as the population of the Peninsula grew: Hillsdale High School (1955) and Aragon High School (1961) in San Mateo, Mills High School (1958) in Millbrae, and Crestmoor High School (1962) in San Bruno.  Due to declining enrollment, Crestmoor was closed in 1980; some of the buildings were later used for Peninsula High School, a continuation school.

The San Mateo Middle College High School is an alternative education program, begun in 1998, which is attended by 35 juniors and 35 seniors selected from high schools in the district. These students take both high school and college courses at College of San Mateo.

The San Mateo Adult School is an adult school with an annual enrollment of over 14,000 whose mission is to "develop skilled workers, strong families, and successful communities by offering opportunities to learn at every stage of adult life."

Design Tech High School (also known as 'd.tech') is a charter school with open enrollment for all students in California which opened in 2014; the first class graduated in 2018. Enrollment is limited to 150 incoming freshmen (Grade 9); transfers for sophomores (Grade 10) are limited, and no transfers are available for juniors and seniors (Grades 11 and 12, respectively). If applicants exceed capacity, a lottery is held to determine enrollment. Oracle Corporation announced in 2015 that it would build a public high school building for d.tech on its campus in Redwood Shores; the new $43 million building was completed in late 2017, replacing the schools initial space (a hallway at Mills High School) and interim campus (at 1800 Rollins Road in Burlingame). Students moved into the new building in January 2018.

Notes

Statistics

Demographics

Standardized testing

Board of Trustees
The San Mateo Union High School District is governed by a five-member board of trustees, whose members are elected by voters residing in the district to serve up to two four-year terms. The Board is responsible for establishing educational goals and standards, approving curriculum and the school district budget, and appoints a superintendent to manage day-to-day administration.

The current trustees are Peter Hanley, Linda Lees Dwyer, Greg Land, Marc Friedman, and Robert Griffin. Former Board President Dave Pine was elected to the District 1 seat on the San Mateo County Board of Supervisors, replacing Mark Church in an all-mail special election which ended on May 3, 2011.

Controversy
The district instituted a "Late start policy starting in the 2017-2018 academic year. While Thursdays ended earlier in previous years (1:45 pm as opposed to 3:15 pm), the late start made it so that Thursdays would start at 9:30, as opposed to the usual 8:00 am and would then end at 3:15 pm. This was controversial, as not all students could take advantage of the late start, as it would interfere with their driving schedule. Additionally, the late start, or more specifically the later end, interfered with many after-school programs.

References

External links

San Mateo Union High School District
 

School districts in San Mateo County, California
1902 establishments in California